The Binghamton was a ferryboat that transported passengers across the Hudson River between Manhattan and Hoboken from 1905 to 1967. Moored in 1971 at Edgewater, Bergen County, New Jersey, United States, the ship was operated as a floating restaurant from 1975 to 2007. In 2017, following ten years of damage that effectively rendered the boat unrestorable, the ferry was dismantled.  No structural components were salvaged.

Binghamton was built for the Delaware, Lackawanna and Western Railroad's Hoboken Ferry Company to carry 986 passengers and their vehicles. Added to the National Register of Historic Places on July 9, 1982, the Binghamton was possibly the last surviving steam ferry built to serve New York Harbor, where commercial steam navigation and double-ended steam ferries got their start, and which was profoundly shaped by vessels of this kind.

Background

Until the Pennsylvania Railroad built Pennsylvania Station in Manhattan and tunneled under the Hudson River, all New York-bound rail lines from the west terminated at the New Jersey shoreline of New York Harbor. Accordingly, a number of independent and railroad-affiliated ferry companies provided passenger and light freight service across the harbor. One particular type of ferryboat, the "double-ender," was especially common in New York Harbor.

Steam navigation met its first commercial success in New York Harbor, with the voyage of Robert Fulton's North River Steamboat (Clermont) from New York to Albany in 1807.  Four years later, in 1811, John Stevens inaugurated what is thought to be the world's first steam ferry service on the Hudson River between Hoboken and Manhattan with the vessel Juliana.  The first American double-ended ferries appeared the following year with the paddle-wheelers Jersey and York of Robert Fulton's York & Jersey Steamboat Ferry Company. Excellent for transporting vehicles, the double-enders were well adapted to New York Harbor, where there was considerable demand for speed and efficiency (vehicles could drive on and off from either end, and time-consuming turns were not necessary). It has been estimated that over 400 double-ended ferries operated in New York Harbor during the nineteenth and twentieth centuries. The peak years were 1906-1908 when approximately 150 double-ended ferries were in service in the Harbor.

The Hoboken Ferry Company was a subsidiary of the Delaware, Lackawanna and Western Railroad (DL&W). The company had a fleet of six ferryboats when it ceased operations in 1967.  These vessels took their names from principal stations on the DL&W RR's main line from Hoboken, New Jersey to Buffalo, New York.  Three of these - the Elmira, Scranton, and Pocono (née Scandinavia) - the Binghamton'''s sisters, were also built in 1905. (Another, the Ithaca, was destroyed by fire in 1946.) Of these, the Binghamton was the last survivor.

The Binghamton's engine: 4 cylinder, double compound, marine steam engine.  Like the double ended ferryboat Binghamton, this engine is of an axially symmetric design. Double compound engines were superseded by more efficient Triple expansion steam engines.

History

The Binghamton (Hull #49) was one of five identical screw-propeller, double-ended ferryboats built by the Newport News Shipbuilding and Dry-dock Company 
at Newport News, Virginia in 1904–06 to designs by Gardner & Cox, naval architects. She was launched on February 20, 1905, with Miss Charlotte Emery, daughter of John M. Emery, the newly promoted superintendent of the Hoboken Ferry Company and Ferry Department of the DL&W, serving as her sponsor. The Binghamton was completed a month later and left the Newport News yard on March 25 for the trip to Hoboken, New Jersey. She was placed in commission on April 3. Her Captain for the first crossing was Oren D. Relyea.

Her normal run was from the Hoboken Terminal to Barclay Street, a twelve-minute journey of approximately 1 and 3/4 miles, a trip made continuously nearly every day for more than sixty years (on occasion she substituted on the Hoboken - 23rd Street run).

As alternate methods of travel across the Harbor were implemented, ferry transport diminished. The opening of the Pennsylvania Railroad line to Penn Station in Manhattan (1907); the Hudson and Manhattan Rapid Transit Line (1907); the Holland and Lincoln tunnels (1927; 1937); and the George Washington Bridge (1931) all contributed to the decline of the ferries. In 1960, the DL&W RR merged with the Erie Railroad to form the Erie-Lackawanna Railroad.  The last ferry crossing of the Hoboken company, in operation since 1821, took place on November 22, 1967, when the railroad closed its trans-Hudson operations and offered its ferries for sale.  The Erie-Lackawanna Railroad eventually filed for bankruptcy before being absorbed into Conrail in 1976.

Hudson River ferry service later experienced a revival, beginning with services provided by NY Waterway in December 1986.  These services are maintained by small, single-ended diesel-powered pedestrian ferries that carry on the tradition of their steam-powered predecessors.  Traditional double-ended ferries (diesel-powered) meanwhile continue to serve in New York Harbor on the Staten Island Ferry.

Appearance in film
In 1948, Marathon Pictures released a crime drama titled Close-Up. A "B" production, it was shot entirely in Manhattan. The film includes a dramatic pursuit scene shot outside of the Hoboken Ferry terminal, at Barclay Street, and on board the ferryboat Binghamton itself. Detailed interiors and exteriors of the ferryboat appear in this scene, as well as passengers and deckhands. The film starred Alan Baxter.

Restaurant conversion

The Binghamton was acquired in 1969 by Edward Russo, an Edgewater, NJ contractor, for conversion into a restaurant. Russo planned large dining rooms on the Upper and Main decks, plus two pubs in the former engine room.  He leased a berth at Edgewater, NJ, and scheduled a grand opening for Labor Day, 1970.  But a tug strike and delays in dredging her berth at Edgewater indefinitely postponed these plans.

The Binghamton moved to Edgewater in 1971. Unable to find a concessionaire to operate the restaurant, Russo relinquished control of the vessel in 1973.  In late 1974, the Binghamton was sold to Ferry Binghamton Inc., of Hackensack, New Jersey, for conversion to a restaurant and nightclub.  On February 28, 1975, her new owners had the vessel moved to a new permanent berth about one half mile downstream.  The restaurant opened later that year.

The US Department of the Interior listed the Binghamton on the National Register of Historic Places in 1982. In 1997 the vessel made headlines when its owner, tycoon and former New Jersey Assembly Speaker Nelson Gross, was found murdered in Manhattan.  The restaurant, known as "Binghamton's", remained in business for ten years, but closed by late 2007, after which the Binghamton remained unused at her berth in Edgewater. In July 2011 the owner applied for a demolition permit. As of May 2012, the ferry had taken on water and was partially submerged. It was further swamped during Hurricane Sandy sometime between October 29 and 30, 2012.

The ferry suffered a fire on Sunday, May 19, 2013, that was investigated by the Edgewater Police and the Bergen County arson squad.  The owner, Daniel Kim, said that there was no damage to the boat.  He further stated that he was closing on a deal to have a subtenant demolish and remove the ferry from the site, with plans to open a restaurant on a barge at that location. Demolition was expected to start in December 2016, and was completed by mid-2017. A replacement floating restaurant, named Binghamton II, was scheduled to open in Summer 2018, but to this day, no progress has been made for the future restaurant.

On July 26, 2017, the dismantling of the ferry began.  Efforts to save the pilot houses were in vain when the demolition crew damaged the pilot houses in the process of removing them from the ferryboat's roof.

Gallery
The Binghamton at Edgewater, NJ. Photos by T.E. Rinaldi, September 2004.

The Binghamton in May 2012

The Binghamton in June 2015

The Binghamton in May 2017

The Binghamton in June 2017, the week of its removal

 See also 
 Delaware, Lackawanna and Western Railroad
 Hoboken Terminal
 Erie Railroad
 Erie Lackawanna Railway
 Robert Fulton
 John Stevens (inventor)
 Eureka (ferryboat)
 Berkeley (ferryboat)
 Hudson River Waterfront Walkway
 National Register of Historic Places listings in Bergen County, New Jersey
 List of ferries across the Hudson River to New York City

 Further reading 
Adams, Arthur G. and Raymond J. Baxter.  Railroad ferries of the Hudson: and stories of a deckhand.  New York: Fordham University Press, 1999.
Cudahy, Brian J. Over and back: the history of ferryboats in New York Harbor. New York: Fordham University Press, 1990.
Scull, Theodore W. Hoboken's Lackawanna Terminal''.  New York:  Quadrant Press, 1986.

References

External links
Historic photo of the Binghamton in service at Flickr.
http://www.nnapprentice.com/alumni/letter/BINGHAMTON_%20NNS_Hull_49.pdf
http://shipbuildinghistory.com/shipyards/large/newportnews.htm

Edgewater, New Jersey
Ferries of New Jersey
1905 ships
National Register of Historic Places in Bergen County, New Jersey
Delaware, Lackawanna and Western Railroad
New Jersey Register of Historic Places
Ships on the National Register of Historic Places in New Jersey
Floating restaurants